Morley E. Drury (February 15, 1903 – January 21, 1989), nicknamed "The Noblest Trojan of Them All," was a quarterback for the University of Southern California.

College career
A graduate of Long Beach Polytechnic High School, Drury was a prominent quarterback for the USC Trojans of the University of Southern California, helping coach Howard Jones in leading USC during the 1920s.

Drury's finest season came in 1927 as the senior captain employed his skillful passing and rushing to carry the Trojans to an 8–1–1 record. USC shared the Pacific Coast Conference title with Stanford University, battling the Indians to a 13–13 deadlock. The only smudge on the Trojan record was a mid-season loss to powerful Notre Dame, 7–6. Drury had 180 yards and three touchdowns against Washington, prompting the crowd at Memorial Coliseum to give him a 10-minute standing ovation.  Drury led the team in scoring (76 points) and rushing (1163 yards) and won first-team All-America honors. His 1163 yards marked the first time a USC player surpassed 1,000 yards rushing and stood as a USC record until Mike Garrett eclipsed the mark with 1440 yards during his 1965 Heisman Trophy campaign.

Drury was elected to the College Football Hall of Fame in 1954. Drury died in 1989. In 2010, Morley Drury joined his late brother, former NHL hockey player and United States Olympian Herb Drury, as an inductee of the Midland (Ontario) Sports Hall of Fame, in the Athlete category.

References

External links
 

1903 births
1989 deaths
All-American college football players
American football quarterbacks
Canadian emigrants to the United States
Canadian expatriates in the United States
Canadian players of American football
Gridiron football people from Ontario
USC Trojans football players
College Football Hall of Fame inductees
People from Midland, Ontario
Players of American football from Long Beach, California